Manuel Ureña Pastor (born 4 March 1945) is a Spanish prelate of the Catholic Church who became a bishop in 1988 and served as ordinary in Ibiza, Alcalá de Henares, and Cartagena before becoming Archbishop of Zaragoza, the position he held from 2005 until he retired in 2014. He resigned citing health problems, though later reports demonstrated his mishandling of a charge of harassment against one of his priests.

Biography
Manuel Ureña Pastor was born in Albaida, Valencia, on 4 March 1945. He attended the Escuela Nacional de Albaida from 1951 to 1959 and then entered the Metropolitan Seminary of Valencia in Moncada. He earned his licentiate in dogmatic theology at the Pontifical University of Salamanca in 1973. He was ordained a priest on 14 July 1973 in Valencia. He was a pastoral vicar for three years and then earned a doctorate in philosophy at the Pontifical University Angelicum in 1984.

Pope John Paul II named him Bishop of Ibiza on 8 July 1988. He received his episcopal consecration on 11 September from Archbishop Mario Tagliaferri, Apostolic Nuncio to Spain. He served as well as the apostolic administrator of the Diocese of Menorca from 1990 to 1991.

On 23 July 1991, John Paul named him the first  Bishop of Alcalá de Henares, newly created from the Archdiocese of Madrid, and on 1 July 1998, he was made Bishop of Cartagena and became Grand Chancellor of the Universidad Católica San Antonio de Murcia.

Zaragoza
On 12 March 2005, John Paul named him Archbishop of Zaragoza, though the appointment was not announced until 2 April, hours before John Paul's death. He was installed on 19 June. He became ex officio Grand Chancellor of the Universidad San Jorge in Zaragoza. In the Spanish Episcopal Conference he was a member of the Episcopal Commission for Teaching and Catechesis.

On 12 November 2014, Pope Francis accepted his resignation as archbishop under the legal formula allowing for resignation "for reasons of health or other serious reason". Ureña had several surgeries in recent years, and he released a statement citing health reasons. Later that month, local media reported, and the Catholic weekly Vida Nueva confirmed, that Ureña was forced to resign for having paid thousands of Euros to an adult deacon who had been sexually harassed by a priest in Épila, a sum designed to finance his studies toward a university degree now that he no longer sought ordination. No action was taken against the priest. The Archdiocese admitted the payment and said it was not related to Ureña's resignation because of his health.

Notes

References

External links
 Catholic-Hierarchy: Archbishop Manuel Ureña Pastor 
 Archdiocese of Zaragoza: El arzobispo emérito

1945 births
Living people
21st-century Roman Catholic archbishops in Spain